Haberdashers' Monmouth School for Girls Rowing Club is a rowing club on the western bank of River Wye, based at The Boathouse, Old Dixton Road, Monmouth, Monmouthshire, Wales.

History
The club was founded in 1990 and belongs to the Haberdashers' Monmouth School for Girls.

Currently, the Monmouth Rowing Club boathouse hosts the boats and equipment from Haberdashers' Monmouth School for Girls Rowing Club and Monmouth Comprehensive School Boat Club (founded 1992).

The club has produced multiple British champions

Honours

British champions

References

Sport in Monmouthshire
Rowing clubs in England
Rowing clubs of the River Wye
Monmouth, Wales
Scholastic rowing in the United Kingdom
Women's rowing in the United Kingdom